Chandan Dasgupta, (born 1951) is an Indian theoretical physicist known for his contributions in condensed matter physics and statistical physics. He is at present a professor at Indian Institute of Science, Bangalore. He was the former dean of Undergraduate Program at Indian Institute of Science.

Biography
Chandan Dasgupta earned his BSc degree in 1971 from Presidency College, University of Calcutta and MSc degree from Delhi University in 1973. He did his doctoral research at the University of Pennsylvania, USA under the supervision of Professor AB Harris and obtained PhD degree in Physics in 1978. Subsequently, he did post-doctoral research at the University of California, San Diego with Shang-keng Ma  and at Harvard University with Bertrand Halperin, and worked as a faculty member in the School of Physics and Astronomy of the University of Minnesota for a few years. He joined the Indian Institute of Science in 1987, where, at present, he is a Professor.

Professor Dasgupta played a major role in the establishment of the Centre for Condensed Matter Theory at the Indian Institute of Science in 1998 and acted as the Convenor of the Centre (1998-2005). He is an Honorary Professor at the Jawaharlal Nehru Centre for Advanced Scientific Research and holds a Visiting Professorship at the University of Minnesota, USA.

Research
Prof Chandan Dasgupta's area of specialization is theoretical condensed matter physics with emphasis on statistical mechanics.
 Supercooled liquids and the glass transition
 Superconductivity and superfluidity
 Dynamics of nonequilibrium systems
 Physics at the nanoscale

Awards and honours
Chandan Dasgupta was awarded Sir C.V. Raman Award for Research in Physical Sciences in 2006 by the University Grants Commission.
In 2007, he was elected as a fellow of The World Academy of Sciences .
He was awarded with "The Satyendranath Bose Medal" by Indian National Science Academy in 2018.

References

External links

Indian condensed matter physicists
Living people
20th-century Indian physicists
Academic staff of the Indian Institute of Science
1951 births
Scientists from Kolkata